Red Planet Blues may refer to:

A 1984 ABC Warriors story by Alan Moore, Steve Dillon and John Higgins published in the 2000AD Annual 1985
A 2013 novel by Robert J. Sawyer